Artem Ivanovych Kychak (born 16 May 1989) is a Ukrainian professional footballer who plays as a goalkeeper.

Career
Kychak's first professional club was Dynamo Kyiv, but didn't play any match for the main team. In 2010, he was close for signing a contract with Metalurh Zaporizhzhia in the Ukrainian Premier League, but the deal was called off.

International career
He was called up to Ukraine national under-21 football team for some matches during 2009, but not selected for game.

References

External links
  
 
 

Living people
1989 births
Footballers from Vinnytsia
Ukrainian footballers
Association football goalkeepers
Ukraine youth international footballers
FC Dynamo-3 Kyiv players
FC Dynamo-2 Kyiv players
FC Dynamo Kyiv players
FC Volyn Lutsk players
FC Olimpik Donetsk players
MTK Budapest FC players
NK Veres Rivne players
FC Obolon-Brovar Kyiv players
Ukrainian Premier League players
Ukrainian First League players
Ukrainian Second League players
Nemzeti Bajnokság I players
Ukrainian expatriate footballers
Expatriate footballers in Hungary
Ukrainian expatriate sportspeople in Hungary